Rajagiri School of Engineering & Technology (Autonomous) (RSET) is an educational institution located in Kochi, Kerala, India, offering engineering education and research. RSET is affiliated to APJ Abdul Kalam Technological University and approved by the All India Council for Technical Education (AICTE).

RSET is managed by the Sacred Heart Province of the Carmelites of Mary Immaculate (CMI) congregation. RSET is a part of the Rajagiri Vidyapeetham (transl. "seat of knowledge").

In 2020, the college was granted autonomous status by the University Grants Commission, being among the first technical institutions in Kerala to have such a status.

Courses offered 
RSET offers undergraduate programs in B. Tech and postgraduate programs in M. Tech and Ph. D. levels.

B. Tech:

   Applied Electronics & Instrumentation Engineering
   Artificial Intelligence & Data Science
  Civil Engineering
  Computer Science & Engineering
  Electrical & Electronics Engineering
  Electronics & Communication Engineering
  Information Technology
  Mechanical Engineering 

From 2021, the college, in collaboration with Tata Consultancy Services, provides Computer Science & Business Systems undergraduate program.

M. Tech:

 Communication Engineering

   Computer Science & Information Systems
   Industrial Drives & Control
   Network Engineering
   VLSI & Embedded Systems

Ph. D.

 Chemistry
   Computer Science
   Electrical Engineering
   Electronics Engineering
   Information Technology
   Mathematics
   Mechanical Engineering
   Physics

Notable alumni
 Shane Nigam, Malayalam Film Actor 
 Jakes Bejoy, Music Director

References

External links

Engineering colleges in Kochi
2001 establishments in Kerala
Educational institutions established in 2001